The Democratic Current is a social-democratic political party in Tunisia that was founded in 2013.

The party was initiated by the former secretary-general of the Congress for the Republic, Mohamed Abbou who also served as deputy prime minister in the Jebali Cabinet until June 2012. It is committed to the project of realizing  an "Arab federal state reuniting the Arab nations freed from the yoke of dictatorship".

After the 2019 Tunisian parliamentary election, the party agreed to form a parliamentary bloc with the People's Movement.

Election results

Parliamentary elections

Municipal elections

References

External links
 

2013 establishments in Tunisia
Arab nationalism in Tunisia
Nationalist parties in Africa
Pan-Arabist political parties
Political parties established in 2013
Political parties in Tunisia
Progressive parties
Social democratic parties in Tunisia